High Life is the second collaboration between Brian Eno and Karl Hyde, of British electronic group Underworld. The album follows Someday World and was released on 30 June 2014.

Background 
The album is Eno's sixth for Warp, and was recorded following the announcement of his first collaboration with Karl Hyde. Eno was quoted saying, "when Someday World was finished I felt like we were still on a roll and I wasn't ready to stop working and get into 'promotional mode' for that record. So I suggested we immediately start on another album, a different one, where we extended some of the ideas we'd started, and attempted some of the ideas we hadn't."

The album was released on 30 June 2014 (1 July in North America) on CD and digitally with a vinyl copy which features two additional tracks, "Slow Down, Sit Down & Breathe" (also on the digital edition) and "On a Grey Day".

Track listing

Personnel 
 Brian Eno – vocals, synthesizers, treatments, guitars, organ, background vocals
 Karl Hyde – vocals, guitar, bass guitar, background vocals
 Fred Gibson – keyboards, drums, percussions, background vocals
 Leo Abrahams – guitar, bass guitar
 Marianna Champion – background vocals
 Rick Holland - lyrics

Charts

References

External links 
 Eno • Hyde homepage

2014 albums
Albums produced by Brian Eno
Brian Eno albums
Collaborative albums
Warp (record label) albums
Albums produced by Fred Again